Mary Anne Barker, Lady Barker (29 January 1831 – 6 March 1911), later Mary Anne Broome, Lady Broome, was an English author. She wrote mainly about life in New Zealand.

Biography

Born Mary Anne Stewart in Spanish Town, Jamaica, she was the eldest daughter of Walter Steward, Island Secretary of Jamaica. She was educated in England, and in 1852 married Captain George Robert Barker of the Royal Artillery, with whom she had two children. When Barker was knighted for his leadership at the Siege of Lucknow, Mary Anne became "Lady Barker". Eight months later Barker died.

On 21 June 1865, Mary Anne Barker married Frederick Napier Broome. The couple then sailed for New Zealand, leaving her two children in England. The couple's first child was born in Christchurch in February 1866, but died in May. By this time, they had moved to the sheep station Steventon, which Broome had partnered with H. P. Hill to buy. They remained there for three years; they lost more than half their sheep in the winter of 1867, and in response Broome sold out and the couple returned to London.

Both Mary Anne and her husband then became journalists. Still calling herself "Lady Barker", Mary Anne Broome became a correspondent for The Times and published two books of verse: Poems from New Zealand (1868) and The Stranger from Seriphos (1869). In 1870, she published Station Life in New Zealand, a collection of her letters home. The book was successful, going through several editions and being translated into French and German.

Over the next eight years, Lady Barker wrote ten more books, including A Christmas Cake in Four Quarters (1871), a sequel to Station Life entitled Station Amusements in New Zealand (1873), and First Lessons in the Principles of Cooking (1874). This last title led to her being appointed Lady Superintendent of the National Training School of Cooking in South Kensington.

When Frederick Broome was appointed Colonial Secretary of Natal in 1875, Lady Barker accompanied him there. Broome's subsequent colonial appointments had him travelling to Mauritius, Western Australia, Barbados, and Trinidad. Drawing on these experiences, Lady Barker published A Year's Housekeeping in South Africa (1877) and Letters to Guy (1885).

Frederick Broome was knighted on 3 July 1884, and thereafter Mary Anne called herself "Lady Broome". She published the last of her 22 books, Colonial Memories under this name. After Sir Frederick Broome's death in 1896, Lady Broome returned to London, dying there on 6 March 1911.

She is buried with her husband Frederick on the eastern side of Highgate Cemetery.

Works
Station Life in New Zealand (Whitcomb and Tombs, 1870, reprinted 1950)
Station Amusements in New Zealand (1873)
A Year's Housekeeping in South Africa (Macmillan, 1877)
The Bedroom and Boudoir (1878)

References

Lady Barker (as writer) on Canterbury Library website
Lady Barker (as pioneer) on Canterbury Library website
Station Life... & Station Amusements... on Electronic Text Centre website

Further reading

The Seven Lives of Lady Barker: Betty Gilderdale. Publisher: David Bateman, Auckland, New Zealand, 1996 . Full biography
The Seven Lives of Lady Barker: Betty Gilderdale. Publisher: Canterbury University Press, Christchurch, New  Zrealand, 2009 . New edition
Station Life in New Zealand: Lady Barker. With an introduction and notes by Betty Gilderdale. Vintage, Auckland, New Zealand, 2000

External links

1831 births
1911 deaths
Burials at Highgate Cemetery
Jamaican non-fiction writers
Jamaican women writers
Australian diarists
British writers
Women diarists
19th-century New Zealand writers
19th-century New Zealand women writers